Qukës is a former municipality in the Elbasan County, eastern Albania. At the 2015 local government reform it became a subdivision of the municipality Prrenjas. The population at the 2011 census was 8,211. The municipal unit consists of the villages Berzheshte, Dritaj, Fanje, Gurre, Karkavec, Menik, Pishkash, Pishkash Veri, Qukës-Shkumbin, Qukës-Skenderbej and Skroske. In the later Ottoman era about a quarter of the city of Qukes itself was Bektashi. Via Egnatia [5] passes through Qukës, which was a very important trade route in the Balkans during the conquest of the Roman Empire.

References

Former municipalities in Elbasan County
Administrative units of Prrenjas